WHCR-FM (90.3 FM) is a radio station licensed to New York City. The station is currently owned by City College of New York.

Signal
Despite its small wattage and only crediting Harlem in its branding, the station covers all of upper Manhattan alongside nearby parts of the Bronx and portions of Hudson County, New Jersey (including Fort Lee, North Bergen and West New York). On a clear day, the station can reach all of the boroughs except for Staten Island, parts of Long Island and Westchester, and areas of New Jersey from Passaic to Alpine to Newark, according to RadioLocator.

References

External links 
 
 

HCR-FM
Radio stations established in 1986
1986 establishments in New York City
City College of New York